Andrew Dermot Morrogh is a British art historian and academic. He has taught in the United States at the University of Oregon College of Design  and assistant at the Department of Art History at the University of Chicago. He has published several books and articles on the art and architecture of the Italian Renaissance. Among his publications is the catalogue of an exhibition he organised for the Uffizi, Disegni di Architetti Fiorentini 1540–1640 (1985).

Education and fellowships 
Morrogh graduated from Oxford in classics. His doctor's degree in the history of art is from the Courtauld Institute in 1983. He holds a fellowship at Harvard's Villa I Tatti (The Harvard University Center for Italian Renaissance Studies in Florence, Italy) and a postdoctoral fellowships at the New York University Institute of Fine Arts and at Princeton.

Career 
Morrogh is Associate Professor of Art History Emeritus, History of Art and Architecture, University of Oregon, Eugene, and belonged to the History Faculty at the Department of Art History of the University of Chicago from 1981 to 1990.

Publications 

 The Early History of the Cappella De' Principi Florence, 1983.(Thesis) .
 Renaissance Studies in honor of Craig Hugh Smyth - 1985  Giunti Barbera
 Disegni di Architetti Fiorentini 1540–1640   - 1 January 1985 Olschki 
 "The Medici Chapel: The Designs for the Central Tomb.” Studies in the History of Art, vol. 33, 1992, pp. 142–161. JSTOR
 “The Chapel of the Beato Amedeo at Vercelli: Valperga, Guarini, Garove (1680-82).” Mitteilungen Des Kunsthistorischen Institutes in Florenz, vol. 43, no. 1, 1999, pp. 80–102. JSTOR
 Journal of the Society of Architectural Historians, vol. 69, no. 2, 2010, pp. 150–151. JSTOR
 “The Gritti Monuments in San Francesco Della Vigna, Venice: The Case for Palladio's Authorship.” Journal of the Society of Architectural Historians, vol. 69, no. 2, 2010, pp. 206–233. JSTOR
 "Guarini and the Pursuit of Originality: The Church for Lisbon and Related Projects.” Journal of the Society of Architectural Historians, vol. 57, no. 1, 1998, pp. 6–29. JSTOR
 "The Magnifici Tomb: A Key Project in Michelangelo's Architectural Career.” The Art Bulletin, vol. 74, no. 4, 1992, pp. 567–598. JSTOR
 The palace of the Roman people : Michelangelo at the Palazzo dei Conservatori, Tübingen: Ernst Wasmuth Verlag, 1994

Contributor 
Studies in the History of Art, vol. 33, 1992, pp. 285–287. JSTOR

Other information 
Photographs contributed by Andrew Morrogh to the Conway Library are currently being digitised by the Courtauld Institute of Art, as part of the Courtauld Connects project

References

External links 
"Niccolò Gaddi and Giorgio Vasari", thirty-minute video of a lecture given by Morrogh at the Morgan Library in March 2016.

British art historians
Year of birth missing (living people)
British expatriate academics in the United States
Living people
University of Oregon faculty
University of Chicago faculty